Johnny Aubert (born 31 May 1980) is a French enduro rider and two-time world-champion. A former motocross rider, Aubert debuted in the World Enduro Championship riding for Yamaha in 2006. He claimed the world championship in the E2 class in the 2008 season. After switching to KTM, he successfully defended his title in 2009. In 2010, Aubert won the International Six Days Enduro (ISDE) World Trophy with the French national team. He was the fastest rider overall in the competition in 2007 and 2010.

Career summary

ISDE

Dakar Rally

References

External links

Official website

1980 births
Living people
Enduro riders
French motocross riders

Dakar Rally co-drivers